Bénoye is a city in the Logone Occidental Region, Chad. It is the administrative center of the Ngourkosso Department.

Population
Population by years:

References

Populated places in Chad